The De Aar 1 Solar Power Station is an 85.26 MW solar power plant in South Africa. The solar farm is owned by South African independent power producer (IPP), Solar Capital (Pty) Limited, a subsidiary of the Phelan Energy Group, which is headquartered in Dubai, United Arab Emirates. The off-taker of the power generated here is Eskom Holdings, the national electricity parastatal company, under a 20-year power purchase agreement (PPA).

Location
The geographical coordinates of De Aar 1 Solar Power Station are:30°35'46.0"S, 24°05'36.0"E (Latitude:-30.596111; Longitude:24.093333).

Overview
The design calls for a ground-mounted solar panel power station with generation capacity of 85.26 MW. The power generated is directed to a 132kV Eskom substation, on the solar farm. From there, the power is evacuated by an overhead 132kV Eskom transmission line that traverses the solar farm. Eskom buys all the power generated here, under a long-term PPA for integration into the South African national grid. The power station reached commercial commissioning in August 2014, as part of Round 1 of the South African government's Renewable Energy Independent Power Producer Procurement Programme (REIPPPP).

Developers
De Aar 1 Solar Power Station is owned and was funded, developed and constructed by Solar Capital (Pty) Limited of South Africa. It was commissioned in August 2014, as the largest solar project of the first round of the REIPPPP arrangement.

Other considerations
In September 2022, online media reported that Juwi Holding AG, a German renewable energy company had been awarded the operations and maintenance (O&M) contract for this power station. The work has been delegated to Juwi's South African subsidiary, based in Cape Town.

See also

List of power stations in South Africa

References

External links
 Website of Solar Capital, South Africa

Solar power stations in South Africa
Pixley ka Seme District Municipality
Northern Cape
2014 establishments in South Africa
Energy infrastructure completed in 2014
21st-century architecture in South Africa